Youngblood is a surname.  Notable people with the name include:

Betty Youngblood, president of Lake Superior State University in Sault Ste. Marie, Michigan
Brenna Youngblood (born 1979), American artist
Francis M. Youngblood (1835–1907), American lawyer and politician
Gene Youngblood (1942–2021), media art theorist
Harold F. Youngblood (1907–1983), U.S. Representative from Michigan
Jack Youngblood (born 1950), NFL Hall of Fame player
Jay Youngblood or Steve Romero (1955–1985), American professional wrestler
Jim Youngblood (born 1950), former NFL player
Joel Youngblood (born 1951), former all-star baseball player
Joshua Youngblood (born 2001), American football player
Lonnie Youngblood (born 1941), saxophonist and bandleader
Luke Youngblood (born 1986), actor
Mary Youngblood (born 1958), Native American flutist
Monica Youngblood, American politician
Rosita Youngblood (born 1946), member of the Pennsylvania House of Representatives, 198th District
Rudy Youngblood or Tee-Dee-Nae (born 1982), actor
Rufus Youngblood (1924–1996), United States Secret Service agent
Sydney Youngblood (born 1960), American-born German singer
Tally Youngblood, a character in the Uglies series
Thomas Youngblood (born 1974), guitarist and founding member of Kamelot
 Larry Youngblood, criminal defendant in the Supreme Court case Arizona v. Youngblood

Surnames
Native American surnames